The discography of Oussama Belhcen, a Moroccan pop singer and songwriter, contains three studio album and six singles.

Belhsen's debut album, Ana Wnti, was released by L-Boyz Record in December 2008. The first single, "Nhar Ela Nhar", had reached number fourth on the Soundclick chart in the Moroccan area in March 2008. The second self-titled album Ryan Belhsen; was released in 2010.

In March 2010, Belhsen released the track "Baghi Nkon Meak" as the lead single from the upcoming third album, Dayman. The single, debuted at number-one on Listening and Downloading in Reverbnation & Soundclick by the Moroccan location. Second single, "Neish Hdak" was released in January 2011 and debuted at number-one; featuring back vocals from Leyla Queen. Then the third single "Mehtaj Lik" released in April 2011 and reached number two in Reverbnation by Moroccan location, in addition the single backs to be released by a music video on 19 March.  And the fourth single "Khallini Nebghik" released on 21 February, and reached number-one in Soundclick and number six in Reverbnation by Moroccan location. The album will be released in summer 2012.

Belhsen also recorded the song "Ana Huwa Ana" with the Moroccan rappers Aklo and Ibrahim B, which it co-written, composed and produced by him. Oussama has also co-written songs for many rappers and singers coming from Larache.

In 2013, he released a final single titled "Meghribiya" featuring the rapper Aklo on April, then for few months he decided to make a stop for his musical career, for some unknown personal reasons.

After he abandoned his music career for nearly two years, earlier in 2015, Oussama revealed on his Facebook page that he will come back to the music industry, and in a talk to a local press Larache24 he said that his upcoming single will be titled "Kolshi Bin Yeddi" and he also said that he will return with his real name "Oussama Belhcen" instead of his former stage name "Ryan Belhsen".
On 25 May 2015 he released his single "Kolshi Bin Yeddi" then the second single "Nehar Lik Wenhar Alik" on 27 November 2015.

Studio albums
As Ryan Belhsen

Singles
As Ryan Belhsen

As Oussama Belhcen

Mixtapes

Music videos

Other appearances

References

External links
 Discography of Oussama Belhcen

Discographies of Moroccan artists
Pop music discographies